ELEAGUE Major: Atlanta 2017, also known as ELEAGUE Major 2017 or Atlanta 2017, was the tenth Counter-Strike: Global Offensive Major Championship. It was organized by ELEAGUE and held in Atlanta, Georgia, United States from January 22 to 29, 2017. It featured sixteen professional teams from around the world. Eight teams directly qualified based on their top eight placement in the last major, ESL One Cologne 2016, while another eight teams qualified through the ELEAGUE Offline Major Qualifier. ELEAGUE Major was the third consecutive Major with a prize pool of $1,000,000.

The playoff stage consisted of eight teams. Astralis, Fnatic, Gambit Gaming, Natus Vincere, SK Gaming, and Virtus.pro were returning Legends. FaZe Clan and North were new Legends, replacing FlipSid3 Tactics and Team Liquid, who failed to make it past the group stage. The grand finals pitted Astralis, in its first ever final after nine playoff appearances, and Virtus.pro, which was in its second finals and looking for its second major title. Astralis had defeated Natus Vincere and Fnatic in the playoff stage, while Virtus.pro had beaten North and defending champions SK Gaming. In the third map of the best-of-three final, Astralis edged out Virtus.pro in the final round of regulation for its first major title.

Background
Counter-Strike: Global Offensive (CS:GO) is a multiplayer first-person shooter video game developed by Hidden Path Entertainment and Valve. It is the fourth game in the Counter-Strike series. In professional CS:GO, the Valve-sponsored Majors are the most prestigious tournaments.

Entering the 2017 ELEAGUE Major, the two-time defending champion was SK Gaming, which won both MLG Columbus 2016 (as Luminosity Gaming) and ESL One Cologne 2016. SK was also the first non-European team to win a Major. At the time, Fnatic was the most decorated team, with three Majors, and SK Gaming was in second, with two.

Format 
The top eight teams from the ESL One Cologne 2016 ("Legends") were automatically invited to ESL One Cologne 2016. The remaining eight spots were filled by teams that advanced from the ELEAGUE Major Main Qualifier. The ELEAGUE Main Qualifier was a 16-team tournament consisting of the bottom eight teams from Cologne 2016, as well as eight teams promoted from four regional qualifiers. The top eight teams at the Main Qualifier then advanced to the Major as the "Challengers".

Unlike previous Majors, which used the GSL-format for group stages, this Major was the first to use the Swiss-system for group stages. The top eight teams at the end of the group stage advanced to the playoff stage. All playoff matches were best-of-three, single elimination.

Map pool
The seven-map pool did not change from Cologne 2016. Before each best-of-one match in the group stage, teams alternated banning maps until five maps had been banned. One of the two remaining maps was randomly selected, and the team that that did not get a third ban then selected which side it wanted to start on. In all best-of-three series, each team first banned a map, leaving a five-map pool. Each team then chose a map, with the opposing team selecting which side they wanted to start on for their opponent's map choice. The two map picks were the first two maps in the best-of-three. The teams then each banned one more map, leaving one map remaining for the best-of-three decider if necessary.

Broadcast talent
ELEAGUE retained much of the broadcast team that had been featured in ELEAGUE Season 1 and Season 2.

Hosts
 Sue "Smix" Lee
 Chris Puckett

Analysts
 Richard Lewis
 Jason "moses" O'Toole
 Duncan "Thorin" Shields

Commentators
 James Bardolph
 Anders Blume
 Henry "HenryG" Greer
 Daniel "ddk" Kapadia
 Auguste "Semmler" Massonnat
 Matthew "Sadokist" Trivett

Observers
 Kevin "kVIN_S" Swift
 David DJ "Prius" Kuntz
 Benjamin "CoffeeMcSwagger" Budka

Others
 Jason "Alchemist" Baker (Producer)
 Steve Daily (Director)
 Reece Fowler (Gameplay Director)

Broadcasts
All streams were broadcast on Twitch in various languages.

Major Qualifier
Like the previous Majors, there was a single Main Qualifier after four Minors, or regional qualifiers. The bottom eight teams from ESL One Cologne 2016 received automatic bids to the Main Qualifier. Two teams each from the Asia, North America, Europe, and CIS Minors also competed in the Main Qualifier.

Regional Qualifiers
The final four teams from each qualifier are shown below: two from each moved on to the Main Qualifier.

Asia Minor

Europe Minor

CIS Minor

Americas Minor

Main Qualifier
The Main Qualifier was a sixteen-team Swiss-system tournament in which, after the first round, teams only played other teams with the same win–loss record. Each match was best-of-one, and no team played another team twice. All teams played until they had either won or lost three games: any team with three wins advanced to the Major, and any team with three losses was eliminated.

First round seeding was determined by the following:
 Teams that placed 9th-12th at the previous Major (Team Dignitas, FaZe Clan, mousesports, Ninjas in Pyjamas) were first seeds
 Teams that placed 13th-16th at the previous Major (Team EnVyUs, G2 Esports, OpTic Gaming, Counter Logic Gaming) were second seeds
 Teams that placed first in their regional qualifiers (TyLoo, Vega Squadron, GODSENT, Immortals) were third seeds
 Teams that were runners-up in their regional qualifiers (Renegades, Team Spirit, Hellraisers, Cloud9) were fourth seeds

GODSENT and FaZe Clan were the first teams to advance to the Major. The next three teams to move on were mousesports, OpTic Gaming, and Team Dignitas. In the fifth round of matches, the final teams to move on were Team EnVyUs, G2 Esports, and HellRaisers.

Teams

Teams competing
The top eight teams from ESL One Cologne 2016, the Legends, were joined by the eight teams to advance from the main qualifier, the Challengers.

1 The five players and coach of Team Dignitas mutually part ways with the team shortly after the Major Qualifier. The roster is then signed by the Danish football (soccer) club F.C. Copenhagen and Nordisk Film was named North.

Perhaps the biggest change was Team Dignitas and the Philadelphia 76ers and their players and coach mutually parting ways and the organizations announced plans to build a North American roster; in addition, it plans to invest into positions such as a sports psychologist and a nutritionist. The coach, Casper "ruggah" Due, said, despite "competitive offers," the roster decided to leave the team. Roughly a day later, the team is reported to sign with the Danish football (soccer) club F.C. Copenhagen and the Denmark-based Nordisk Film and officially signed on January 3, 2016. The team will be called North.

GODSENT acquired Robin "flusha" Rönnquist, Jesper "JW" Wecksell, and  Freddy "KRiMZ" Johansson from Fnatic, who acquired Jonas "Lekr0" Olofsson and Simon "twist" Eliasson, so GODSENT acquired the Legends spot from Fnatic. However, KRiMZ rejoined Fnatic while Lekr0 rejoined GODSENT, giving the Legends spot back to Fnatic.

Pre-major ranking
The HLTV.org January 16, 2017 ranking, the final one released before the ELEAGUE Major, is displayed below.

†Change since January 9, 2017 ranking

Group stage
The group stage was a sixteen-team Swiss-system format in which, after the first round, teams only played other teams with the same win–loss record. Each match was best-of-one, and no team played another team twice. All teams played until they had either won or lost three games: any team with three wins advanced to the playoff stage, and any team with three losses was eliminated.

First round seeding was determined by the following:

Teams that placed top four at the previous Major (SK Gaming, Team Liquid, Fnatic, Virtus.pro) were first seeds
Teams that placed 5th-8th place at the previous Major (Astralis, FlipSid3 Tactics, Gambit Gaming, Natus Vincere) were second seeds
Teams that placed first in the main qualifier (GODSENT, FaZe Clan) and the top two teams that placed third based on their seeds going into the major qualifier (North, mousesports) were third seeds
The remaining teams (OpTic Gaming, Team EnVyUs, G2 Esports, HellRaisers) were fourth seeds

In the first round, first seeds played a randomly drawn fourth seed, and second seeds played a randomly drawn third seed. After this round, teams were randomly drawn against other teams with the same record (e.g., 1–0 teams against 1–0 teams, 0–1 teams against 0–1 teams). The eight teams to win three (out of a possible five) games were granted "Legend" status and an automatic invitation to the next Major.

This was the first Major in which GODSENT players Robin "flusha" Rönnquist and Jesper "JW" Wecksell did not advance to the playoffs, after losing to North in the fifth round and placing 9th. They had maintained Legend status with Fnatic prior to transferring to GODSENT.

{| class="wikitable" style="text-align: center;"
|-
! width="20px"  | Place
! width="425px" | Team
! width="50px"  | Record
! width="50px"  | Differential
! width="240px" | Round 1
! width="240px" | Round 2
! width="240px" | Round 3
! width="240px" | Round 4
! width="240px" | Round 5
|-
| rowspan="2"| 1–2
| Natus Vincere
| 3–0
| +36
| style="background: #D0F0C0;" | mousesports16–3Cobblestone
| style="background: #D0F0C0;" | High matchTeam EnVyUs16–6Cobblestone
| style="background: #D0F0C0;" | High matchSK Gaming16–3Dust II
| style="background: #D0F0C0;" | Playoffs
| style="background: #D0F0C0;" | Playoffs
|-
| Virtus.pro
| 3–0
| +11
| style="background: #D0F0C0;" | OpTic Gaming16–13Cobblestone
| style="background: #D0F0C0;" | High matchG2 Esports16–14Nuke
| style="background: #D0F0C0;" | High matchGambit Gaming16–10Train| style="background: #D0F0C0;" | Playoffs
| style="background: #D0F0C0;" | Playoffs
|-
| rowspan="3"| 3–5
| Gambit Gaming
| 3–1
| +11
| style="background: #D0F0C0;" | North16–8Cobblestone| style="background: #D0F0C0;" | High matchGODSENT16–9Overpass| style="background: #FFCCCC;" | High matchVirtus.pro10–16Train| style="background: #D0F0C0;" | High matchFaZe Clan16–14Overpass| style="background: #D0F0C0;" | Playoffs
|-
| Fnatic
| 3–1
| +7
| style="background: #FFCCCC;" | G2 Esports10–16Cache| style="background: #D0F0C0;" | Low matchNorth16–13Cobblestone| style="background: #D0F0C0;" | Mid matchmousesports16–11Dust II| style="background: #D0F0C0;" | High matchTeam EnVyUs16–11Cobblestone| style="background: #D0F0C0;" | Playoffs
|-
| SK Gaming
| 3–1
| 0
| style="background: #D0F0C0;" | HellRaisers16–7Mirage| style="background: #D0F0C0;" | High matchFaZe Clan19–17Mirage| style="background: #FFCCCC;" | High matchNatus Vincere3–16Dust II| style="background: #D0F0C0;" | High matchAstralis19–17Dust II| style="background: #D0F0C0;" | Playoffs
|-
| rowspan="3"| 6–8
| Astralis
| 3–2
| +15
| style="background: #FFCCCC;" | GODSENT6–16Train| style="background: #D0F0C0;" | Low matchOpTic Gaming16–12Train| style="background: #D0F0C0;" | Mid matchG2 Esports16–11Train| style="background: #FFCCCC;" | High matchSK Gaming17–19Dust II| style="background: #D0F0C0;" | Team Liquid16–3Mirage|-
| FaZe Clan
| 3–2
| +12
| style="background: #D0F0C0;" | FlipSid3 Tactics16–9Nuke| style="background: #FFCCCC;" | High matchSK Gaming17–19Mirage| style="background: #D0F0C0;" | Mid matchTeam Liquid22–18Nuke| style="background: #FFCCCC;" | High matchGambit Gaming14–16Overpass| style="background: #D0F0C0;" | Team EnVyUs16–11Nuke|-
| North
| 3–2
| +2
| style="background: #FFCCCC;" | Gambit Gaming8–16Cobblestone| style="background: #FFCCCC;" | Low matchFnatic13–16Cobblestone| style="background: #D0F0C0;" | Low matchHellRaisers19–15Mirage| style="background: #D0F0C0;" | Low matchG2 Esports16–9Overpass| style="background: #D0F0C0;" | GODSENT19–17Overpass|-
| rowspan="3"| 9–11
| Team EnVyUs
| 2–3
| -3
| style="background: #D0F0C0;" | Team Liquid25–21Cache| style="background: #FFCCCC;" | High matchNatus Vincere6–16Cobblestone| style="background: #D0F0C0;" | Mid matchGODSENT16–13Cache| style="background: #FFCCCC;" | High matchFnatic11–16Cobblestone| style="background: #FFCCCC;" | FaZe Clan11–16Nuke|-
| GODSENT
| 2–3
| -4
| style="background: #D0F0C0;" | Astralis16–6Train| style="background: #FFCCCC;" | High matchGambit Gaming9–16Overpass| style="background: #FFCCCC;" | Mid matchTeam EnVyUs3–16Cache| style="background: #D0F0C0;" | Low matchOpTic Gaming16–8Cache| style="background: #FFCCCC;" | North17–19Overpass|-
| Team Liquid
| 2–3
| -7
| style="background: #FFCCCC;" | Team EnVyUs21–25Cache| style="background: #D0F0C0;" | Low matchFlipSid3 Tactics16–14Overpass| style="background: #FFCCCC;" | Mid matchFaZe Clan18–22Nuke| style="background: #D0F0C0;" | Low matchmousesports16–4Nuke| style="background: #FFCCCC;" | Astralis3–16Mirage|-
| rowspan="3"| 
| G2 Esports
| 1–3
| -11
| style="background: #D0F0C0;" | Fnatic16–10Cache| style="background: #FFCCCC;" | High matchVirtus.pro14–16Nuke| style="background: #FFCCCC;" | Mid matchAstralis11–16Train| style="background: #FFCCCC;" | Low matchNorth9–16Overpass| style="background: #FFCCCC;" | Eliminated
|-
| OpTic Gaming
| 1–3
| -12
| style="background: #FFCCCC;" | Virtus.pro13–16Cobblestone| style="background: #FFCCCC;" | Low matchAstralis12–16Train| style="background: #D0F0C0;" | Low matchFlipSid3 Tactics16–13Train| style="background: #FFCCCC;" | Low matchGODSENT8–16Cache| style="background: #FFCCCC;" | Eliminated
|-
| mousesports 
| 1–3
| -22
| style="background: #FFCCCC;" | Natus Vincere3–16Cobblestone| style="background: #D0F0C0;" | Low matchHellRaisers16–7Cache| style="background: #FFCCCC;" | Mid matchFnatic11–16Dust II| style="background: #FFCCCC;" | Low matchTeam Liquid4–16Nuke| style="background: #FFCCCC;" | Eliminated
|-
| rowspan="2"| 
| FlipSid3 Tactics
| 0–3
| -12
| style="background: #FFCCCC;" | FaZe Clan9–16Nuke| style="background: #FFCCCC;" | Low matchTeam Liquid14–16Overpass| style="background: #FFCCCC;" | Low matchOpTic Gaming13–16Train| style="background: #FFCCCC;" | Eliminated
| style="background: #FFCCCC;" | Eliminated
|-
| HellRaisers 
| 0–3
| -22
| style="background: #FFCCCC;" | SK Gaming7–16Mirage| style="background: #FFCCCC;" | Low matchmousesports7–16Cache| style="background: #FFCCCC;" | Low matchNorth15–19Mirage| style="background: #FFCCCC;" | Eliminated
| style="background: #FFCCCC;" | Eliminated
|}

Playoffs
Bracket
Natus Vincere and Virtus.pro were the top seeds after the group stage, and would face a random opponent from the pool of Astralis, FaZe Clan, and North (the teams who finished 3–2). Natus Vincere was paired with Astralis and Virtus.pro drew North. From the pool of Gambit Gaming, Fnatic, and SK Gaming (the teams who finished 3–1), Gambit and Fnatic were randomly drawn to face each other. The remaining two teams, SK Gaming and FaZe Clan, were then paired to finalize the bracket.

Quarterfinals
Natus Vincere vs. AstralisCasters: James Bardolph & ddkThe first game of the playoffs in the Fox Theatre pitted Natus Vincere and Astralis against each other.

Gambit Gaming vs FnaticCasters: Anders Blume & SemmlerVirtus.pro vs NorthCasters: Sadokist & HenryGVirtus.pro was the other team along with Na'Vi to go a perfect 3–0 in the group stage, defeating OpTic Gaming, G2 Esports, and Gambit Gaming.

SK Gaming vs FaZe ClanCasters: Anders Blume & SemmlerSK Gaming was considered the world's best team of 2016 after winning the two majors of the year, MLG Columbus 2016 and ESL One Cologne 2016, and could be the first team ever to win three major titles in a row.

Semifinals
Astralis vs FnaticCasters: Sadokist & HenryGVirtus.pro vs SK GamingCasters: James Bardolph & ddkThe two-time defending champions in SK Gaming will faced off against Virtus.pro for the third Major in a row, with SK squeaking past Virtus.pro in both of those prior series.

FinalsCasters: Anders Blume & Semmler''

After five quarterfinal and four semifinal eliminations, the roster of Astralis finally made the a grand finals at a Major. Virtus.pro, however, had been to and won a Major final at EMS One Katowice 2014, defeating the Ninjas in Pyjamas two games to zero. Since then, Virtus.pro had not been back to a grand finals.

The first map was Nuke, a map Virtus.pro was considered very strong on. Astralis would tie the game at 12 rounds apiece, but Virtus.pro won the next four rounds, taking the first map 16–12. Snax and byali lead the way for the Polish team with 24 kills while Kjaerbye lead Astralis with 22 kills and gla1ve and dev1ce had 20 kills.

The second map was Overpass. Virtus.pro took the lead for the first time since round one at 14-13 and were two rounds away from taking the Major. However, Astralis won the last three rounds, taking Overpass 16–14. Xyp9x was the most impactful with 28 kills. dev1ce had the least kills of either team with only 13 kills.

The final map, Train, was historically known as one of Virtus.pro's strongest. After a strong Virtus.pro start, Astralis made a late comeback, tying the score at 14 and taking their first lead at 15–14. After winning the final round of regulation, Astralis was crowned the champion of the ELEAGUE Atlanta Major. Kjaerbye had 29 kills in the final map, and was named the Major MVP; he became the youngest player to earn the title.

Final standings
The final standings are shown below. The in-game leaders of each team are shown first.

Post-Major Ranking
The HLTV.org January 30, 2017 rankings of teams in the major is displayed below. The ranking was the first one released after the ELEAGUE Major.

†Change since January 23, 2017 ranking

Clash for Cash
ELEAGUE announced a televised rematch, dubbed the "Clash for Cash", between the two finalists on June 16, 2017. It featured a 250,000 prize pool for the winner. Despite losing the first map in the best-of-three, Astralis dominated the last two maps and took the match.

References

2017 esports television series
2017 first-person shooter tournaments
Counter-Strike: Global Offensive Majors
International esports competitions hosted by the United States
January 2017 sports events in the United States
Sports competitions in Atlanta
ELeague competitions